Castleton is a civil parish in the High Peak district of Derbyshire, England.   The parish contains 25 listed buildings that are recorded in the National Heritage List for England.  Of these, one is listed at Grade I, the highest of the three grades, one is at Grade II*, the middle grade, and the others are at Grade II, the lowest grade. The parish contains the village of Castleton and the surrounding countryside and moorland.  The most important building in the parish is the ruined Peveril Castle, which is listed at Grade I.  The other listed buildings include houses, cottages and associated structures, farmhouses and farm buildings, a church and a sundial in the churchyard, a hotel and a public house, a former watermill, three mileposts, a school, a war memorial, and a telephone kiosk.


Key

Buildings

References

Citations

Sources

 

Lists of listed buildings in Derbyshire